A Wild-Eyed Christmas Night is the eleventh studio album by the southern rock band 38 Special, released in 2001.

Track listing
"Jingle Bell Rock" (Joe Beal, Jim Boothe) – 2:20
"Here Comes Santa Claus" (Gene Autry, Oakley Haldeman) – 2:17
"The Little Drummer Boy" (Katherine Kennicott Davis, Henry Onorati, Harry Simeone) – 3:52
"Hallelujah, It's Christmas!" (Don Barnes, Danny Chauncey, Donnie Van Zant) – 4:02
"It's Christmas and I Miss You" (Barnes, Jim Peterik) – 4:03
"A Wild-Eyed Christmas Night" (Peterik) – 4:04
"That Old Rockin Chair" (Chauncey, Van Zant) – 4:01
"Santa Claus Is Back in Town" (Jerry Leiber, Mike Stoller) – 3:37
"O Holy Night" (Traditional) – 5:28
"God Rest Ye Merry Gentlemen" (Traditional) – 2:52

Personnel
Don Barnes – guitar, mandolin, vocals
Bobby Capps – keyboards, vocals
Danny Chauncey – guitar, keyboards
Larry Junstrom – bass guitar
Scott Meeder – drums
Donnie Van Zant – vocals

Production 
Producers: Don Barnes, Danny Chauncey
Executive producers: Ken Caillat, John Trickett
Production Coordination: Melinda Pepler
Engineers: Don Barnes, Bobby Capps, Danny Chauncey
Mixing: Danny Chauncey, Ben Fowler, Rick Fowler
Mastering: Brian Foraker, Charlie Watts
Programming: Scott Meeder
Voiceover: Jannelle Guillot
Graphic design: Rupesh Pattni, Chuck Ybarra
Photography: Glen Rose
Authoring: Kristian Storli
Quality control: Randy Glenn

References

38 Special (band) albums
2001 Christmas albums
Christmas albums by American artists
CMC International albums